Natalie Savage Carlson (October 3, 1906 – September 23, 1997) was a 20th-century American writer of children's books. For her lifetime contribution as a children's writer, she was United States nominee for the biennial, international Hans Christian Andersen Award in 1966.

She was born in Kernstown, Virginia of French Canadian descent, and worked many old family stories and folktales into early books like The Talking Cat and Other Stories of French Canada (1952). Carlson published her first story at age eight on the children's page of the Baltimore Sunday Sun. For The Family Under the Bridge, she was a runner-up for the 1959 Newbery Medal from the professional librarians, which annually recognizes the "most distinguished contribution to American literature for children".

Carlson died on September 23, 1997 in Rhode Island.

Works
The Talking Cat: and other stories of French Canada, illustrator Roger Duvoisin, Harper, 1952
The Happy Orpheline, illustrator Garth Williams, Harper, 1957
The Family Under the Bridge, Harper, 1958; reprint HarperCollins, 1989, 
A Brother for the Orphelines, illustrator Garth Williams, Harper, 1959
Evangeline, Pigeon of Paris, illustrator Nicholas Mordvinoff, Harcort Brace Jovanovich, 1960; 
reissued as Pigeon of Paris, illustrator Quentin Blake, Scholastic, 1972
The Tomahawk Family, illustrator Stephen Cook, Harper, 1960 
A Pet for the Orphelines, illustrator Fermin Rocker, Harper, 1962
Jean-Claude's Island, illustrator Nancy Ekholm Burkert, Harper & Row, 1963.
School Bell in the Valley, Harcourt, 1963, 
The Orphelines in the Enchanted Castle, illustrator Adriana Saviozzi, Harper, 1964
The Empty Schoolhouse, HarperCollins, 1965, 
Chalou, Harper & Row, 1967, pictures George Loh, AC 67-10034
Ann Aurelia and Dorothy, illustrator Dale Payson, Harper & Row, 1968
The Half Sisters, illustrator Thomas Di Grazia, Harper & Row, 1970
Luvvy and the Girls, illustrator Thomas Di Grazia, Harper & Row, 1971
Marie Louise's Heyday, illustrators Jose Aruego, Ariane Dewey, Scribner, 1975, 
Runaway Marie Louise, illustrators Jose Aruego, Ariane Dewey, Scribner, 1977, 
The Night the Scarecrow Walked, illustrators Charles Robinson, 1979,

References

1906 births
1997 deaths
American children's writers
People from Frederick County, Virginia
Newbery Honor winners
20th-century American writers
20th-century American women writers